Dryer (or drier) may refer to:

Drying equipment
 Hair dryer
 Hand dryer
 Clothes dryer, also known as a tumble-dryer
 Belt dryer
 Desiccant, a substance that absorbs or adsorbs water
 Grain dryer, for storage grain bins
 Oil drying agent, an additive which accelerates the film formation of a drying oil

Other
 Dryer (surname)
 Dryer (band), a Saratoga Springs, NY based band

See also
 
 
 Drying
 Dreier (disambiguation)
 Dreyer